Yaylacık is a village in the Merzifon District, Amasya Province, Turkey. Its population is 70 (2021). In 2005 it passed from the Amasya District to the Merzifon District.

References

Villages in Merzifon District